The governor of Kerala is the constitutional head of state of the southern Indian state of Kerala. The governor is appointed by the president of India for a term of five years and holds office at the president's pleasure. The governor is de jure head of the government of Kerala; all its executive actions are taken in the governor's name. However, the governor must act on the advice of the popularly elected council of ministers, headed by the chief minister of Kerala, who thus holds de facto executive authority in the state. The Constitution of India also empowers the governor to act upon his or her own discretion, such as the ability to appoint or dismiss a ministry, recommend President's rule, or reserve bills for the president's assent. Over the years, the exercise of these discretionary powers have given rise to conflict between the elected chief minister and the central government–appointed governor.

Since 6 September 2019, Arif Mohammad Khan, is the governor of Kerala.

Governors of Kerala

See also
 Kerala
 Governors of India
 Chief Minister of Kerala

External links
 Governors of Kerala

References

Governors of Kerala
Kerala
Governors
Governors